Robert Singer (born December 3) is an American television producer, director and writer. He is known for his work on Supernatural where he serves as an executive producer, director and occasional writer. The character Bobby Singer was named after him. A fictionalized version of Singer appears in the season 6 episode The French Mistake played by Brian Doyle-Murray. Singer also created the series Reasonable Doubts and has worked as a producer and director on various television series, including Lois & Clark: The New Adventures of Superman. He also served as a producer for the films Cujo and Burnt Offerings. His production company is December 3rd Productions, named after his birth date.

References

External links

 

Showrunners
American television writers
American television producers
American television directors